Randy Hymes (born August 7, 1979) is a former American football wide receiver. He was signed by the Baltimore Ravens as an undrafted free agent in 2002. He played college football at Grambling State.

Hymes was also a member of the Jacksonville Jaguars and Minnesota Vikings

External links
Jacksonville Jaguars bio
Baltimore Ravens bio
Just Sports Stats

1979 births
Living people
Sportspeople from Galveston, Texas
Players of American football from Texas
American football wide receivers
Grambling State Tigers football players
Baltimore Ravens players
Jacksonville Jaguars players
Minnesota Vikings players
Cleveland Gladiators players
Abilene Ruff Riders players
Bossier–Shreveport Battle Wings players
Spokane Shock players
Pittsburgh Power players